Johnston is an unincorporated community in Franklin County, Pennsylvania, United States. It is located in Antrim Township.

References 

Unincorporated communities in Franklin County, Pennsylvania
Unincorporated communities in Pennsylvania